Paolo Bürgi (born 4 September 1947, in Muralto) is a Swiss landscape architect.

Career 
Paolo Bürgi graduated as a landscape architect from the Rapperswil School of Engineering (Hochschule für Technik Rapperswil) in 1975, winning first prize. His experience abroad has allowed him to get in touch with architect Luis Barragán, winner of Pritzker Prize in 1980. In 1977 he started his own practice and office of landscape architecture in Camorino, Switzerland.

He teaches at Politecnico di Milano since 2015 and since 1997 he is an adjunct professor at the University of Pennsylvania School of Design and at IUAV University of Venice since 2003.

He has been visiting professor at the Mediterranea University of Reggio Calabria and at the Knowlton School of Architecture in Columbus, Ohio.

His works focuses particularly on projects on the open space and in relation with architecture, in both the public and private fields, in Switzerland and abroad.

Paolo Bürgi is considered to be one of Europe's most acclaimed landscape architects. Particularly known for creating minimalist landscape interventions that powerfully reveal the essence of a place. Bürgi looks beyond a site's physical boundaries and takes into account its cultural and topographical history.

His work has been presented at several conferences and published in various countries, including: Europe, Korea, Chile, Argentina, China, Japan, Canada, United States.

Selected projects 
 , a new entrance plaza for CERN, Geneva, Switzerland 
 Cardada: Reconsidering a mountain, Cardada, Switzerland 
 American Heart Institute, Nicosia, Cyprus 
  – Urban Agriculture, Essen, Germany 
  - New Art Museum of Grisons, Chur, Switzerland 
 , Kreuzlingen, Switzerland 
 , Sierre Geronde, Switzerland 
 , Lugano, Switzerland 
 Academy of Architecture – open space design, Mendrisio, Switzerland 
 Motto Grande Quarry Park, Camorino, Switzerland 
 OSC - Casvegno Park, Mendrisio, Switzerland 
 Open-Air Museum on the Carso Goriziano, Gorizia, Italy

Prizes and achievements 
 2019 "", Orticolario
 2019 "", CERN , mention in the category "Landscape"
 2018 "European Landscape Award", finalists' selection
 2014 "", mention in the category "Landscape" 
 2011 "", mention for the project ", "
 2011 "", for the project American Heart Institute in Cyprus
 2003 "European Landscape Award" prize for the project Cardada, Reconsidering a mountain
 2003 "" prize for the project 
 1988 "Premio ASPAN" for the Motto Grande Quarry project in Camorino

Bibliography (selection) 
 John Dixon Hunt - Historical Ground - The role of history in contemporary landscape architecture, Routledge 2014 
 Regionalverband Ruhr - Unter freiem Himmel - Under the Open Sky - Emscher Landschaftspark, 2013 
 Xin Wu - Restoring Landscape Design as an Art, Conversations between Xin Wu and seven contemporary landscape designers from China, EU and US: 7 Paolo Bürgi - Between Design and Creative Interpretation, Beijing: , 2012 (China Architecture % Building Press) 
 John Dixon Hunt (transl. V. Morabito) - Sette lezioni sul paesaggio, 2012 
 Massimo Venturi Ferriolo - Paesaggi: Sguardo dal Theatron, L'Orbicolare, 2007 
 Michel Conan - Contemporary Garden Aesthetics, Creations and Interpretations, Dumbarton Oaks 2007 
 Monika Suter, Peter Egli - , 2006 
 John Dixon Hunt - The Afterlife of Gardens, University of Pennsylvania Press - Reaktion Books LTD, 2004 
 Michael Rohde, Rainer Schomann - Historic Gardens Today, Leipzig, 2004 
 , 2003 
 Claudia Cassatella, Francesca Bagliani - , 2003 
 John Dixon Hunt - Greater Perfections: The Practice of Garden Theory, 2000

References

External links 

 Studio Bürgi – Landscape Architecture
 Cardada Viewpoint by Paolo L. Bürgi « Landscape Architecture Platform | Landezine
 Landschaftsarchitektur heute - bdla - Landschaftsarchitektur heute - bdla
 @ Paolo Bürgi website - CDAN NEWSLETTER MAY 2008
 PAOLO BÜRGI

1947 births
Living people
Swiss landscape architects
People from Muralto